Ricky Hurtado (born December 7, 1988) is an American politician and educator who previously served as a member of the North Carolina House of Representatives from the 63rd district. Elected in November 2020, he assumed office on January 1, 2021.

Early life and education
Hurtado was raised in Sanford, North Carolina, the son of immigrants from El Salvador. He earned a Bachelor of Business Administration from University of North Carolina at Chapel Hill where he was a Morehead-Cain Scholar. He also received a Master of Public Affairs from Princeton University.

Career
From 2010 to 2013, Hurtado worked as a consultant at Frontline Solutions, a business management consultancy service in Durham, North Carolina. He then worked as a public policy intern for the mayor of Philadelphia and for PolicyLink in Oakland, California. As a graduate student, Hurtado was also a teaching assistant at Princeton University. In 2018, Hurtado founded LatinxEd. He has also worked as an adjunct professor at the University of North Carolina at Chapel Hill School of Education and as the executive director of the Scholars' Latino Initiative at UNC-Chapel Hill. Hurtado was elected to the North Carolina House of Representatives in November 2020. When he assumed office, he became the first Latino Democrat to serve in the General Assembly.

He was defeated in the 2022 North Carolina House of Representatives election in a rematch with Stephen Ross.

Electoral history

2022

2020

References

Living people
1988 births
21st-century American politicians
American politicians of Salvadoran descent
University of North Carolina at Chapel Hill alumni
Princeton University alumni
University of North Carolina at Chapel Hill faculty
Democratic Party members of the North Carolina House of Representatives
Hispanic and Latino American state legislators